This is a list of flag bearers who have represented Saint Vincent and the Grenadines at the Olympics.

Flag bearers carry the national flag of their country at the opening ceremony of the Olympic Games.

See also
Saint Vincent and the Grenadines at the Olympics

References

Saint Vincent and the Grenadines at the Olympics
Saint Vincent and the Grenadines
Olympic flagbearers
Olympics